Rita Brigitte Paul (2 December 1928 in Berlin, Germany - 27 March 2021 in Berlin, Germany) was a German singer and film actress.

Selected filmography
 Scandal at the Embassy (1950)
 The Man in Search of Himself (1950)
 Homesick for You (1952)
 Ideal Woman Sought (1952)
 Hit Parade (1953)
 My Leopold (1955)
 When the Heath Is in Bloom (1960)

References

Bibliography
 Shandley, Robert. Rubble Films: German Cinema In Shadow Of the Third Reich. Temple University Press, 2010.

External links

1928 births
2021 deaths
German women singers
German film actresses
German television actresses
Singers from Berlin